Eucalyptus herbertiana, commonly known as Kalumburu gum or yellow-barked mallee, is a species of small tree or mallee that is endemic to northern Australia. It has smooth bark, lance-shaped or curved adult leaves, flower buds in groups of seven, white flowers and cup-shaped, hemispherical or conical fruit.

Description
It has smooth, powdery white bark with salmon coloured or creamy yellow new bark. Flowering occurs in January, from June to July or from November to December and the flowers are white or creamy white. The Northern Territory Flora reports that this ecualypt is deciduous during the later dry season.

Taxonomy
Eucalyptus herbertiana was first formally described by the botanist Joseph Maiden in 1923 in his book A Critical Revision of the Genus Eucalyptus. The name honours Australian botanist Desmond Herbert.

Eucalyptus herbertiana belongs to a small group of species closely related to the red gums and is most closely related to E. cupularis and E. gregoriensis. It is similar in appearance to and closely related to the mountain white gum (E. mooreana) but E.mooreana has stem-clasping leaves.

Distribution and habitat
Kalumburu gum is found growing in skeletal soils amongst sandstone outcrops, hillsides and at the bases of ridges in the Kimberley region of Western Australia, the top end of the Northern Territory and into western Queensland.

Conservation status
This mallee is classified as "not threatened" by the Western Australian Government Department of Parks and Wildlife, and as "least concern under the Northern Territory Government Territory Parks and Wildlife Conservation Act 2000 and the Queensland Government Nature Conservation Act 1992.

See also
List of Eucalyptus species

References

Eucalypts of Western Australia
Trees of Australia
herbertiana
Myrtales of Australia
Plants described in 1923
Taxa named by Joseph Maiden